Solariella lacunella, common name the channelled solarielle, is a species of sea snail, a marine gastropod mollusk in the family Solariellidae. This species occurs in the Caribbean Sea, the Gulf of Mexico and the Lesser Antilles; in the Atlantic Ocean off North Carolina and Florida at depths between 18 m and 1472 m.

Description 
The maximum recorded shell length is 8.7 mm.

Habitat 
Minimum recorded depth is 18 m. Maximum recorded depth is 1472 m.

References

 Dall, W. H. 1881. Reports on the results of dredging, under the supervision of Alexander Agassiz, in the Gulf of Mexico, and in the Caribbean Sea, 1877–79, by the United States Coast Survey Steamer 'Blake,'. Bulletin of the Museum of Comparative Zoology 9: 33–144.
 Dall, W. H. 1889. Reports on the results of dredgings, under the supervision of Alexander Agassiz, in the Gulf of Mexico (1877–78) and in the Caribbean Sea (1879–80), by the U. S. Coast Survey Steamer 'Blake,'. Bulletin of the Museum of Comparative Zoology 18: 1–492, pls. 10–40
 Rosenberg, G., F. Moretzsohn, and E. F. García. 2009. Gastropoda (Mollusca) of the Gulf of Mexico, Pp. 579–699 in Felder, D.L. and D.K. Camp (eds.), Gulf of Mexico–Origins, Waters, and Biota. Biodiversity. Texas A&M Press, College Station, Texas.

External links
 

lacunella
Gastropods described in 1881